Not for Threes is the second studio album by English electronic music duo Plaid. It was released on 27 October 1997 by Warp. The album was released in the United States on 28 April 1998 by Nothing Records.

Critical reception

In 2017, Pitchfork ranked Not for Threes at number 36 on its list of the 50 best IDM albums of all time.

Track listing

Personnel
Credits are adapted from the album's liner notes.

Plaid
 Ed Handley – production
 Andy Turner – production, vocals (on "Ladyburst")

Additional musicians
 Benet – guitar (on "Kortisin", "Rakimou" and "Lilith"), violin (on "Rakimou" and "Lilith")
 Björk – vocals (on "Lilith")
 Coba – accordion (on "Rakimou" and "Lilith")
 Mara – vocals (on "Myopia", "Ladyburst" and "Rakimou")
 Nicolette – vocals (on "Extork")

Design
 Robert Clifford – photography
 Think 1 – design

Charts

References

External links
 Not for Threes at Warp
 

1997 albums
Plaid (band) albums
Warp (record label) albums
Nothing Records albums